Sergio Berlinguer (6 May 1934 – 17 October 2021) was an Italian diplomat who served as state minister in the first cabinet of Silvio Berlusconi.

Biography

Early life and education
Berlinguer was born in Sassari on 6 May 1934, younger brother of Luigi Berlinguer and cousin of Enrico Berlinguer. He held a law degree from Sapienza University of Rome.

Career
Berlinguer began his career at the ministry of foreign affairs in 1959. He headed its press office. He was the Italian ambassador to the United Kingdom from 1966 to 1983. He served as the general manager of the emigration department of the foreign ministry from 1983 to 1985 and was appointed diplomatic advisor to the Italian President Francesco Cossiga in 1985. Then he became the secretary general and spokesman for the Italian presidency and served in the post until 1992. He was appointed state minister to the first cabinet of Silvio Berlusconi in 1994 and remained in office until 1995. He was also the member of the council of state. In 1996, Berlinguer's movement, Movimento Italiano Democratico (MID), joined Rinnovamento Italiano which in turn was part of the Ulivo coalition for the general elections in 1996.

Other roles and death
A member of the Italian Aspen Institute, Berlinguer died in Rome on 17 October 2021, at the age of 87.

Awards and honors
 Order of Merit of the Italian Republic 1st Class / Knight Grand Cross – 16 January 1988

 Order of Pope Saint Sylvester, Vatican.

References

External links

20th-century diplomats
1934 births
2021 deaths
Ambassadors of Italy to the United Kingdom
Government ministers of Italy
Italian Renewal politicians
People from Sassari
Sapienza University of Rome alumni
Italian political party founders
Knights Grand Cross of the Order of Merit of the Italian Republic